The Bradshaw Mountain Railroad was a  subsidiary of the Santa Fe, Prescott and Phoenix Railway (SFP&P) in Arizona.  The  railroad was built to serve the mines in the Bradshaw Mountains.  The railroad built from a connection at Poland Junction and at Mayer with the Prescott and Eastern Railroad.  The Prescott & Eastern was also operated by the SFP&P.

History

The railroad was incorporated on February 6, 1901.  It commenced grading from the Prescott & Eastern connection at Mayer on September 10, 1901.  The line reached Turkey Creek on November 30, 1902 and the following year it reached Saddle.  Just prior to the line being completed to Crown King, on January 1, 1904, the Bradshaw Mountain was leased to the SFP&P. On May 4, 1904, the Crown King Branch was completed to Crown King.

The railroad also constructed a branch to Poland from a connection with the Prescott & Eastern at Poland Junction.  The Poland Branch was completed on December 17, 1905.

The railroad was operated by the SFP&P by two Brooks 2-8-0 and [4-4-0] locomotives SFP&P #51 and #56 (later ATSF #2439 and #2444) until 1912.  On January 2, 1912, the Bradshaw Mountain Railroad was merged into the California, Arizona and Santa Fe Railway.  The California, Arizona and Santa Fe Railway did not operate the line as it only existed on paper as a subsidiary of the Atchison, Topeka and Santa Fe Railway.

The Bradshaw Mountain Railroad was built to serve the mines of the southern Bradshaw Mountains. Unfortunately, these mines were never very productive, and the BMRR was a financial failure. The line from Middleton to Crown King was abandoned in 1926, and both the Crown King and Poland branches were abandoned in 1939. Much of the road to Crown King uses the old railbed.

Operating railroads
 1901–1912 by the Santa Fe, Prescott & Phoenix Railway
 1912– by the Atchison, Topeka & Santa Fe Railway

Route
The line was eventually abandoned by the ATSF. 
 Mayer
 Blue Bell
 Cordes
 Middleton
 Tunnel
 Crown King

Poland Branch
 Poland Junction
 Henrietta
 Tunnel
 Poland (the track was later extended to Walker)

See also

 List of defunct Arizona railroads

References
 
 
 Sayre, John W. (1985), Ghost Railroads of Central Arizona, Boulder, Colo.: Pruett, 

Defunct Arizona railroads
Predecessors of the Atchison, Topeka and Santa Fe Railway
Prescott, Arizona
Railway companies established in 1901
Railway companies disestablished in 1912
History of Yavapai County, Arizona
American companies established in 1901